Macrothyatira arizana is a moth in the family Drepanidae first described by Wileman in 1910. It is found in Taiwan and the Chinese provinces of Sichuan and Yunnan.

Subspecies
Macrothyatira arizana arizana (Taiwan)
Macrothyatira arizana diminuta (Houlbert, 1921) (China: Sichuan, Yunnan)

References

Moths described in 1910
Thyatirinae
Moths of Asia